Cornet Chahwan (also spelled Kornet Chehwan) is a sizable town in the Mount Lebanon area of Lebanon's Metn District. Cornet Chahwan houses the headquarters for the chab (www.chab.gov.lb) municipalities of 4 villages (including Cornet Chahwan) namely Ain Aar, Beit El Kikko, Hbous and Rabweh. The total area governed by chab municipalities is around 8 million square meters of land, out of which over 30% is covered by green spaces. The town remains one of the best residential areas in Lebanon. 
The President of Chab municipalities is Jean Pierre Gebara (architect). Gebara owns his architectural firm and is a university professor, he has been president of this municipality since 2010.

Demography
There are over 6,000 households and 30,000 inhabitants in the chab Municipalities that are Lebanese and most are followers of the Catholic Church. The town is the seat of the Maronite Archbishopric of Matn. The town has numerous churches, including the historic Saint Peter & Paul Church.

Education
Cornet Chahwan is home to numerous private educational institutes, including three of Lebanon's most prestigious and highly ranked private schools, Saint Joseph school, a trilingual institute founded in 1884, Jesus & Mary school founded in 1963, and International College, Beirut (Ain Aar campus). Saint Coeur is a semi private school also located in Kornet Chahwan.

Culture
The town is home to the Pharès Zoghbi Cultural Foundation, which is a library of 65,000 books in French, English, Spanish, Portuguese, and Arabic.

The town is also home to a state of the art theater called SJS theater at Saint Joseph School in addition to a city hall brand new facility next to St Peter & Paul's church.

Humanitarian Institutions

St Vincent de Paul, a charitable institution, is located in Cornet Chahwan. The Lebanese Red Cross also has a first-aid center in the town. In addition to a fire department covering a vast areas of the El Metn district.

References

External links
Qornet Chahouane - Ain Aar - Beit El Kekko - Hbous, Localiban

Qornet Shehwan
Maronite Christian communities in Lebanon